The Mark Twain Zephyr was an early diesel four-unit articulated zephyr train that was similar to the Pioneer Zephyr in style. The train was built by the Budd Company and was powered by a diesel engine produced by the Winton Engine Company. The train was named after the renowned author Mark Twain because it was scheduled to provide service from St. Louis, Missouri to Burlington, Iowa via Hannibal, Missouri, his hometown. The train's exterior structure used stainless steel, and had a "shovel nose" front.

The power car, number 9903, was named Injun Joe. The three trailer cars received other names of Mark Twain characters, Becky Thatcher, Tom Sawyer and Huck Finn. The train was christened on October 25, 1935 in Hannibal by Nina Clemens Gabilowitsch (1910-1966), the granddaughter and ultimately last descendant of its namesake. The ceremony was broadcast coast to coast on CBS radio. Two days later, it entered revenue service.

CB&Q ownership

The Mark Twain Zephyr was operated by the Chicago, Burlington and Quincy Railroad between October 1935 and April 1958. 

While the Mark Twain Zephyr's "home route" was considered the railroad line between Burlington, Iowa and St. Louis, Missouri via Hannibal, Missouri, the train only spent just a little more than half of its 22.5-year life operating on that route. The equipment was frequently used on other CB&Q routes, most notably: Chicago to Denver, Colorado (1936); Chicago to St. Paul, Minnesota (a few weeks in 1936); St. Louis to Kansas City, Missouri (various extended periods between 1937-1942); Dallas to Houston (a few months in 1938); and Galesburg, Illinois to St. Joseph, Missouri (1953-1957).  

The Mark Twain Zephyr made newspaper headlines following two accidents which occurred during the summer and autumn of 1948. On Saturday, July 31, 1948, the train derailed at the railroad bridge over Devils Creek about four miles west of Viele, Iowa. Only two passengers sustained minor injuries. On Wednesday, October 17, 1948, the train set was again damaged after hitting a loaded sand truck at Spring Grove, Iowa. No passengers, nor the truck driver, were hurt.

In the early 1950's, the Mark Twain Zephyr had two separate incidents involving Mississippi River barges while operating on the CB&Q's 'K-Line', which parallels the busy shipping waterway in Iowa. The first (and most serious) event occurred on Thursday, November 16, 1950. According to news reports, an empty oil barge belonging to the W.C. Harms Company went up on shore north of Keokuk, Iowa, and over the track. 'Injun Joe' and 'Becky Thatcher' derailed as a result of striking the barge. There was only one minor injury, and the 19 passengers on board continued to Burlington via a Keokuk City bus. Rail traffic had to be rerouted via the Carthage branch until the two units could be re-railed. The first wrecker sent from Galesburg was too light for the task and a second wrecker had to be sent. Less than one year later, on Sunday, August 19, 1951, newspaper reports indicate that a barge also was washed ashore and over the tracks of the K-Line near the exact same spot in Keokuk. Luckily, the engineer was able to slow down in time and the Mark Twain Zephyr did not end up striking it. There was, however, a delay for workers to clear the tracks.

In many ways, the articulated design of the Mark Twain Zephyr, which was done to make the train more aerodynamic, became its own downfall. Due to the fixed design, the CB&Q could not add additional cars to the train set during peak travel periods. Crews often had to set up folding chairs in the baggage car for overflow seating, especially during holiday weekends and the even the weekly southbound run into St. Louis on Sunday evenings. The Mark Twain Zephyr saw its last day of operation on April 27, 1958. It was replaced by other diesel trains that could have coaches added or subtracted due to demand.

Previous private ownership

After being retired by the Chicago, Burlington and Quincy Railroad (CB&Q) in April 1958, the Mark Twain Zephyr was put into storage at a locomotive shop in West Burlington, Iowa.

In June 1960, the Mark Twain Zephyr was purchased by Charles "Frank" Dashner of Glenwood, Iowa. Dashner's original plan was to sell the train to Cuba, however rising tensions over Communism and the Cuban Missile Crisis quickly put an end to that opportunity. Dashner then wanted to develop the Mark Twain Zephyr into a rail-themed restaurant and motel, which would have been located at the then newly built Interstate 29 and U.S. Highway 34 intersection. Before Dashner could make the final payment on the Mark Twain Zephyr, he died on February 24, 1961, at the age of 51. The Mark Twain Zephyr had not been moved, pending final payment, remaining at the CB&Q Shops in West Burlington, Iowa. Dashner's widow and then two teenage children had no interest in continuing to own the train. Thus, ownership reverted to the CB&Q, who put it up for sale again.

In June 1962, the Mark Twain Zephyr was purchased by Ernie A. Hayes of Mount Pleasant, Iowa. Hayes owned an insurance company and was a community activist promoting tourism to Mount Pleasant and Southeast Iowa. Hayes was also the creator and developer of the Avenue of the Saints, a highway linking the Twin Cities and St. Louis. The train was moved to Mount Pleasant in September 1962, where it was kept at the Old Thresher's Reunion site in McMillan Park. Hayes encouraged the Midwest Central Railroad, which was part of Old Thersher's Reunion, to construct a standard gauge loop track so that the Mark Twain Zephyr could be put into service as a regional tourist attraction.

In December 1968, Hayes donated the Mark Twain Zephyr outright to the Old Thresher's Reunion and Midwest Central Railroad in hopes of spurring interest. The train continued to be parked at their McMillan Park property in Mount Pleasant, Iowa, for the next 11 years. The Board of Directors of Old Thresher's Reunion and the Midwest Central Railroad were often at odds as to whether it was worth the money to build the track needed for the Mark Twain Zephyr to operate and to pay for its restoration. Some officials felt it would be worth it; others felt their organization's limited funds should be spent on old steam tractors instead. In the end, the Mark Twain Zephyr suffered significant damage from vandalism during the 1970s while in Mount Pleasant and was never restored or operated. During the winter of 1978–1979, Lennis Moore, the then-new CEO of Old Thresher's Reunion and the Midwest Central Railroad convinced the Board to begin looking for buyers for the Mark Twain Zephyr.

In Spring 1979, the train was purchased by Alexander Barket Sr., a prominent Kansas City bank president and real estate promoter specializing in the rehabilitation of commercial buildings. Earlier, Barket had purchased and refurbished more than two dozen passenger cars from the original CB&Q Denver Zephyr and Texas Zephyr, however sold them off to a railroad in Saudi Arabia in 1976 to pay off mounting legal bills. Barket Sr. planned to restore the Mark Twain Zephyr and possibly turn it into a tourist railroad that would carry passengers through nearby Swope Park in Kansas City. In June 1979, while the train cars were being moved from Mount Pleasant, Iowa to a siding on the southwest side of Kansas City, Barket Sr. died unexpectedly.

After Barket Sr.'s untimely death in 1979, ownership of his estate - including the fate of the Mark Twain Zephyr train set - ended up becoming a complicated tangle of lawsuits involving his various companies, creditors, family members, and others. Ownership finally ended up with Westgate Bancshares, Inc., which was headed up by Ken A. Wilson. A 1983 appraisal reported the Mark Twain Zephyr was worth $600,000 "as-is", but had the potential of being worth $6,000,000, if fully restored. The bank and its various brokers struggled for several years to find potential buyers. Wilson confirmed that recording artist Neil Young almost purchased the train during this time period; his intentions were to restore it and use it as a touring vehicle for himself and his band. However, the deal fell through when Young realized the logistics of dealing with freight railroads for every move. 

Dave Simpson, who was drafted by the Buffalo Bills in 1970, became the seventh private owner of the Mark Twain Zephyr in 1983. However, little work was done by Simpson on the train. During this period, the Mark Twain Zephyr remained parked on an industrial siding on the southeast side of Kansas City.

In September 1987, the train set was purchased by a trio of Chicago-area businessmen (Dan Krupske, John C. Lowe, and Ronald Lorenzini), who formed Mark Twain Zephyr, Inc. Almost immediately after purchasing the cars, they moved them to the Mid America Car Corporation, a business on the north side of Kansas City that had its own railroad yard and refurbished railroad cars. Krupske, Lowe, and Lorenzini had hopes of teaming with Coors, who they anticipated would pick up the majority of the restoration costs in exchange for the rights to lease the train for a period of time. The marketing campaign would promote "Silver Bullet" Beer.

In 1988, discussion between Coors and Mark Twain Zephyr, Inc. ended without an agreement. Krupske, Lowe, and Lorenzini decided to re-locate the train closer to where they lived. Between October 1988 and May 1997, the Mark Twain Zephyr was stored on various sidings at the Joliet Army Ammunition Plant. During this period, Mark Twain Zephyr, Inc. was in talks with various other potential partners. Ideas included constriction of a Twain-themed amusement part in Bettendorf, Iowa, a dinner train from Chicago to the Quad Cities, or a stationary restaurant and hotel in Downers Grove or DeKalb, Illinois.

In 1997, the federal government began redevelopment of the Joliet Army Ammunition Plant into the Midewin National Tallgrass Prairie. Plans included removing all railroad sidings on the property, including the ones where the Mark Twain Zephyr had been parked for the previous decade. Krupske, Lowe, and Lorenzini then made a partnership deal with the Relco Locomotive Shops in Minooka, Illinois to store the train. It remained on this property from May 1997 to January 2008. Relco and Mark Twain Zephyr, Inc. could not find additional investors or capital to restore the train. Besides the original Winton engine and trucks/wheels being removed, not much work occurred on the Mark Twain Zephyr.

In late 2007, Relco decided to begin a complete shut down of its Minooka Plant. This forced Mark Twain Zephyr, Inc. to find another home for the train. In January 2008, the Mark Twain Zephyr was moved down to Gateway Rail Services in Madison, Illinois, in the St. Louis Metropolitan Area. Gateway Rail Services has two shop buildings and a dedicated staff to refurbish old passenger railroad cars. Management was interested in potentially getting the contract to do the rebuild of the Mark Twain Zephyr, a deal that would have worth millions of dollars. Unfortunately, not much was done to improve the train during the 12 years it remained at Gateway Rail Services. The Mark Twain Zephyr had basically become an empty stainless steel shell sitting along a fence on the property.

Current ownership and operations
The Wisconsin Great Northern Railroad, a family-owned and operated company, located in Trego, Wisconsin, purchased the Mark Twain Zephyr from Mark Twain Zephyr, Inc. on February 19, 2020. The sale was officially closed on June 30, 2020. The Wisconsin Great Northern's owners, Greg and Mardell Vreeland, made their purchase public on July 27, 2020 through exclusive news articles in TRAINS Magazine and the Milwaukee Journal-Sentinel.

The four cars of the Mark Twain Zephyr and the spare car of the Pioneer Zephyr were shipped from Madison, Illinois to Trego, Wisconsin by semi-truck (Over the Top Contractors) between August 1, 2020 and September 4, 2020. A full-time crew of electricians, carpenters, and other skilled craftspeople employed by the Wisconsin Great Northern Railroad are working on a complete overhaul of the Mark Twain Zephyr at this time. Once restored, the Wisconsin Great Northern Railroad plans to operate the Mark Twain Zephyr on its main railroad line between Trego and Springbrook, Wisconsin.

References

External links
 Gateway Rail Services
 Google Maps satellite view of the train set's current location (April 2010)
 Flickr gallery showing the state of the train in 1983
 A webpage tracking the restoration process

Passenger trains of the Chicago, Burlington and Quincy Railroad
Articulated passenger trains
Railway services introduced in 1935
Budd multiple units
Diesel multiple units of the United States
Chicago, Burlington and Quincy locomotives